The Lyndhurst School District is a comprehensive community public school district that serves students in pre-kindergarten through twelfth grade from Lyndhurst, in Bergen County, New Jersey, United States.

As of the 2020–21 school year, the district, comprising nine schools, had an enrollment of 2,499 students and 185.0 classroom teachers (on an FTE basis), for a student–teacher ratio of 13.51:1.

The district is classified by the New Jersey Department of Education as being in District Factor Group "DE", the fifth-highest of eight groupings. District Factor Groups organize districts statewide to allow comparison by common socioeconomic characteristics of the local districts. From lowest socioeconomic status to highest, the categories are A, B, CD, DE, FG, GH, I and J.

Schools
Schools in the district (with 2020–21 enrollment data from the National Center for Education Statistics) are:
Elementary schools
Columbus School with 132 students in grades K-2
Robert Giangeruso, Principal
Community School with 39 students in grade PreK
Michael Rizzo, Principal
Franklin School with 206 students in grades PreK-2
Jennifer Scardino, Principal
Washington School with 195 students in grades PreK-2
Christina Bernardo, Principal
Memorial Campus with 49 students in grades PreK-2
Michael Rizzo, Principal
Upper elementary schools
Jefferson School with 259 students in grades 3-5
Joseph Vastola, Principal
Roosevelt School with 295 students in grades 3-5
Peter Strumolo, Principal
Lyndhurst Middle School with 566 students in grades 6-8
Shana Wright, Principal
High school
Lyndhurst High School with 760 students in grades 9-12
Laura Vuono, Principal

Administration
Core members of the district's administration are:
Joseph A. DeCorso, Superintendent of Schools
Mark Hayes, Interim Business Administrator / Board Secretary
Dr. Alma Morel, Assistant Superintendent of Schools

Board of education
The district's board of education, with nine members, sets policy and oversees the fiscal and educational operation of the district through its administration. As a Type II school district, the board's trustees are elected directly by voters to serve three-year terms of office on a staggered basis, with three seats up for election each year held (since 2012) as part of the November general election. The board appoints a superintendent to oversee the day-to-day operation of the district.

References

External links
Lyndhurst School District
 
School Data for the Lyndhurst School District, National Center for Education Statistics

Lyndhurst, New Jersey
New Jersey District Factor Group DE
School districts in Bergen County, New Jersey